Emma Dawn Best (born 23 March 1991) is a British Conservative politician, serving as a  Member of the London Assembly (AM) for Londonwide since 2021.

Political career 
She is currently a councillor on Waltham Forest Borough Council where she is Leader of the Conservative Group.

She served as a councillor in Redbridge for the Church End ward between 2014-2018.

In 2021, she stood in the North East London constituency, coming third. She was also on the party's London-wide list and elected through that.

Best is openly gay.

Electoral history

References

External links 

1991 births
Living people
Conservative Members of the London Assembly
Councillors in the London Borough of Waltham Forest
21st-century British women politicians
21st-century British politicians
Lesbian politicians
English LGBT politicians
Women councillors in England